Leon Midas Calmet Standifer, Jr. (April 24, 1925 - November 8, 2016) was an American soldier, novelist, and professor. He was the son of Leonidas Calmet and Emma (Moore) Standifer. He served in the U.S. Army in World War II as a scout in the infantry from 1943 to 1946 and he received Combat Infantryman Badge and the Purple Heart. On  August 17, 1957, he married Marie Scott, who is an archeobotanist. He received his education at Mississippi State University, (B.S. and M.S.) and the University of Wisconsin (now University of Wisconsin–Madison), where he received a Ph.D. in 1959. He taught at Louisiana State University as a professor of horticulture from 1961 to 1990 (professor emeritus, 1990).

Works
Not in Vain: A Rifleman Remembers World War II (1992), memoir
Binding up the Wounds: An American Soldier in Occupied Germany, 1945-1946 (1997), memoir
Gardening in the Humid South (2002), with Edmund N. O'Rourke

References

1925 births
2016 deaths
20th-century American novelists
21st-century American novelists
American male novelists
Novelists from Mississippi
People from Gulfport, Mississippi
Mississippi State University alumni
University of Wisconsin–Madison alumni
Louisiana State University faculty
20th-century American male writers
21st-century American male writers
Novelists from Louisiana
United States Army personnel of World War II